Dogma is a Mexican anthology suspense television series produced by Leonardo Zimbrón and Mónica Vargas Celis for Televisa. The first season premiered on the Blim platform and Canal 5 on November 1, 2017. Production of the first season concluded on September 10, 2016.

The series tells the story of Bruno (Daniel Martínez), an investigator of supernatural events who is forced to work with Alicia (Iliana Fox), a theologian specializing in religious cults. The cases they investigate include rituals of exorcism and other supernatural phenomena.

Synopsis

Season 1: Dogma Libro I 
Bruno Santini, outstanding researcher of miracles and supernatural events is recruited by Velázquez, an enigmatic man who represents a mysterious client. Velázquez offers to Bruno to continue financing its research institute with the condition of solving a series of miraculous and inexplicable cases together with Dr. Alicia Cervantes, renowned theologian and researcher specialized in religious cults.

Cast 
 Iliana Fox as Alicia Cervantes
 Daniel Martínez as Bruno Santini
 Liz Gallardo
 Moisés Arizmendi as Velászquez

Episodes

Awards and nominations

References

External links 
 

Mexican anthology television series
Spanish-language television shows
Blim TV original programming
2017 Mexican television series debuts
Mexican drama television series